Georgios Drosos was a Greek long-distance runner. He competed in the men's marathon at the 1904 Summer Olympics.

References

External links

Year of birth missing
Year of death missing
Athletes (track and field) at the 1904 Summer Olympics
Greek male long-distance runners
Greek male marathon runners
Olympic athletes of Greece
Place of birth missing
Place of death missing